Pollenia labialis is a species of cluster fly in the family Polleniidae.

Distribution
Andorra, Austria, Belgium, Bosnia and Herzegovina, Czech Republic, Denmark, Finland, France, Germany, Great Britain, Greece, Hungary, Ireland, Italy, Latvia, Lithuania, Netherlands, Norway, Poland, Portugal, Romania, Russia, Slovakia, Spain, Sweden, Switzerland, Turkey, Ukraine. Introduced to Canada, United States, China.

References

Polleniidae
Insects described in 1863
Diptera of Europe
Taxa named by Jean-Baptiste Robineau-Desvoidy